Henna (حنّا) is an Arabic male name for John. It is a common given name as well as a surname, particularly among Arab Christians. The Arabic female name Hannah (حَنَّة meaning "blessed") is rarely also anglicized as Henna.
The Hebrew female name Hannah is also used in Yiddish as Henna, Henny or Chienna, and anglicized to Henna.
Henna is also a Finnish female given name (different root; shares the root with Henry).

Given name
 Henna Johansson (born 1991), Swedish wrestler
 Henna Lindholm (born 1989), Finnish ice dancer
 Henna Raita (born 1975), Finnish skier
 Henna Singal (born 1984), Indian singer
 Henna Vänninen (born 1983), Finnish actress
 Henna Virkkunen (born 1972), Finnish politician

Surname
 Bonnie Henna, South African actress
 Christian Henna (born 1972), French soccer player
 Julio J. Henna (1848–1924), Puerto Rican physician
 Sisanda Henna (born 1982), South African actor

Finnish feminine given names